Rudolf Johan Falkenhagen (26 May 1933 – 26 January 2005) was a Dutch actor. He is best known for portraying the role of Snuf in the television series Pipo de Clown.

Filmography

References

External links 

1933 births
2005 deaths
20th-century Dutch male actors
21st-century Dutch male actors
Dutch male television actors
People from Diemen